Guneh (also Romanized as Gūneh; also known as Goneh) is a village in Talkh Ab Rural District, Khenejin District, Farahan County, Markazi Province, Iran. At the 2006 census, its population was 97, in 35 families.

References 

Populated places in Farahan County